

Statistics 2020

Other years

See also
List of airports in Israel

References

External links 
 ....

Israel

Airports, busiest